Arella Karin Guirantes (born October 15, 1997) is a Puerto Rican professional basketball player for the Seattle Storm of the Women's National Basketball Association (WNBA) and for Diósgyőri VTK of the NB I/A. She was drafted by the Los Angeles Sparks of the Women's National Basketball Association (WNBA).

Early life 
Guirantes scored over 2,000 points and was selected to the NYSSWA All-State First Team during her time at Bellport High School. She averaged 33 points, 13 rebounds, 3.5 assists, 3 steals and 2.6 blocks per game at IMG Academy. She was rated the #44 player in the nation per ProspectNation and was the #17 wing player in the 2016 class per Hoopgurlz.

College

Texas Tech
Following her high school career, Guirantes committed to playing for the Texas Tech Lady Raiders. She was second on the team in scoring at 9.9 points per game and started 27 out of 29 games. She was also named Freshman of the Week for the Big 12 one time.

Rutgers
Following her freshman year at Tech, Guirantes transferred to Rutgers. Due to the NCAA transfer rules, she had to sit out the 2016–17 season. In her first season playing for the Knights, Guirantes averaged 12.1 points and 4.3 rebounds. She was named Honorable Mention All-Big Ten. In her second season with Rutgers, she continued to make an impact averaging 20.6 points, 6.0 rebounds, and 3.1 assists. She was rewarded for her hard work with being named to the AP, USBWA, and the WBCA All-American Honorable Mention Team. She was named 1st Team All-Big Ten by the Coaches and Media. She also joined the 1,000 Point Club on January 20 against Michigan State. In her final season with Rutgers, she averaged 20.8 points, 6.0 rebounds, and 5.3 assists. She led the Knights to the 2021 NCAA Division I women's basketball tournament.

Texas Tech and Rutgers statistics

Source

WNBA career

Los Angeles Sparks
Guirantes was the 22nd pick in the 2021 WNBA draft by the Los Angeles Sparks.

Guirantes made the Sparks roster for the 2021 season and played her entire rookie season there. She averaged 3.2 points. Following the 2022 training camp with the Sparks, Guirantes was waived and did not make the team.

Seattle Storm
On February 6, 2023, Guirantes signed a training camp contract with the Seattle Storm.

WNBA career statistics

Regular season

|-
| align="left" | 2021
| align="left" | Los Angeles
| 25 || 2 || 11.6 || .274 || .222 || .808 || 1.3 || 0.6 || 0.3 || 0.2 || 0.5 || 3.2
|-
| align="left" | Career
| align="left" | 1 years, 1 team
| 25 || 2 || 11.6 || .274 || .222 || .808 || 1.3 || 0.6 || 0.3 || 0.2 || 0.5 || 3.2

References

External links

1997 births
Living people
American women's basketball players
Basketball players from New York (state)
Los Angeles Sparks draft picks
Los Angeles Sparks players
People from Long Island
Rutgers Scarlet Knights women's basketball players
Sportspeople from the New York metropolitan area